Robert Stephen "Rob" Moore (born 21 May 1981) is an English field hockey player. Moore is amongst the most capped England players and was a key part of the team that picked up a silver medal at the Champions Trophy 2010 and a gold medal at the European Cup 2009. He appeared in the 2012 London Olympics.

Early career 
Moore is from Winchester, England. He went to school at King Edward VI, Southampton and studied economics at University of Nottingham. Throughout his academic career Moore was involved with all sports, showing a particular talent for hockey and cricket. At the age of 16 whilst playing a hockey match for his school, the coach for the opposing team, who happened to also be the under 21s coach for England, spotted the young player's natural ability and invited him to an England under 21s trial.

International career 
Moore made the England under 21s team the summer of the trials in 1998, and that August was selected for his first tournament; the Under 21s European Cup in Poznan, Poland where the team also managed to pick up a silver medal. In February 2003 aged 21, Moore made his Senior International debut. Since then Moore has racked up 190 caps for England and Great Britain in tournaments such as; the Olympic Games, Athens Greece (2004), Champions Challenge, Alexandria Egypt (2005), European Championships, Leipzig Germany (2005),  Commonwealth Games, Melbourne Australia (2006), World Cup, Monchengladbach Germany (2006), Champions Challenge, Belgium (2007), European Championships, Manchester England (2007), Champions Trophy, Kuala Lumpur Malaysia (2007), Olympic Games, Beijing China (2008), European Championships, Amsterdam Holland (2009), Champions Trophy, Melbourne (2009), World Cup, Delhi India (2010), Champions Trophy, Monchengladbach Germany (2010), Commonwealth Games Delhi India (2010). Moore has also competed in many other uncapped friendly tournaments that have taken him all over the world.

Moore has recently been selected for the Indoor World Cup further adding to, and diversifying his existing hockey skills. Moore will be playing his first indoor capped tournament in Poznan, Poland commencing on 8 February 2011.

In addition to playing internationally, Moore played club hockey in the England Hockey League for Surbiton, having previously played for Trojans, Havant, Teddington, Wimbledon. Moore signed for National League side Fareham Hockey Club for the start of the 2015-16 season.

Modelling 
Whilst living abroad in Germany in 2007 Moore was scouted by a modeling agency and has since done part-time modeling. Though he has done most of his modeling out of the country, for companies such as Tchibo, Citroen Financial Services, and Deutsche Bahn, has also done a few adverts in England, mainly in keeping with his sporting career.

Personal life 
Moore is married to wife Camilla. Together they have four children, Alfred (2010), Finlay (2012), Delilah (2013), and Demelza (2016). Moore and his family live in London and Winchester. As of 2021, he is a biology teacher at Winchester College.

References

External links
 
 
 
 
 England Hockey profile
 EHL Statistics at FixturesLive.com
 EHL Statistics at FixturesLive.com

1981 births
Living people
English male field hockey players
Olympic field hockey players of Great Britain
British male field hockey players
Field hockey players at the 2004 Summer Olympics
2006 Men's Hockey World Cup players
Field hockey players at the 2008 Summer Olympics
2010 Men's Hockey World Cup players
Field hockey players at the 2012 Summer Olympics
Sportspeople from Winchester
Alumni of the University of Nottingham
People educated at King Edward VI School, Southampton
Havant Hockey Club players
Wimbledon Hockey Club players
Surbiton Hockey Club players
Teddington Hockey Club players
Field hockey players at the 2006 Commonwealth Games
Commonwealth Games competitors for England